Rabat (also Romanized as Rabaṭ) is a city in the Central District of Sardasht County, West Azerbaijan province, Iran, in the northeastern portion of the county. It is on the road between Sardasht and Mahabad. At the 2006 census, its population was 7,987 in 1,607 households. The following census in 2011 counted 12,068 people in 2,965 households. The latest census in 2016 showed a population of 15,750 people in 4,030 households. The majority of the people of Rabat speak the Mokryan accent of Kurdish as one of their main languages alongside Persian.

History
Rabat city has historical monuments dating back to ancient Iranian dynasties, such as the Musasir temple, which dates back to the era of the Iranian Medians.

References

Sardasht County

Populated places in West Azerbaijan Province

Populated places in Sardasht County

Cities in West Azerbaijan Province

Kurdish settlements in West Azerbaijan Province